The municipality of Štrpce consists of 16 villages: Berevce, Brezovica, Brod, Vica, Vrbestica, Gornja Bitinja, Gotovusa, Donja Bitinja, Drajkovce, Izance, Jazince, Kostanjevo, Firaja, Sevce, and Strpce. There are 16 churches and 3 mosques located in Štrpce.  There are also several war memorials which represent the cultural and historical values of Štrpce.

Monuments in Štrpce town

Cultural monuments

There are two Orthodox churches among the cultural monuments in Strpce, one dedicated to St. John and the other to St. Nicholas. Venerated by the citizens of Strpce. St. John and St. Nicholas are each celebrated in a traditional Orthodox way known as Slava.

St. Nicholas' Church

The Orthodox church of St. Nicholas was built between 1576 and 1577.   Its narthex was added later at an unknown time. The church's painting of Iconostasis is considered to be from the early to middle 19th century. One part of a wall hidden underneath the church, which was discovered by a priest, features frescoes, indicating that the current church of St. Nicholas was built upon older remains of an unknown church. According to legend, the unknown church was destroyed during a flood long ago, however parts of the ruins are still visible. Due to the Ottoman Empire's occupation of Serbia, the church's belfry was not built until 1912. It was renovated in 1962 through funding from citizens of Strpce. In 2004, the interior of the church of St. Nicholas was repainted by a priest.

St. John's Church

St. John's Church was built in 1911 on the foundation of another unknown church, just as St. Nicholas' Church was built. In 2003, the belfry was added. Inside the church there are frescoes. During 2013 the church was renovated.

War memorials
The war memorials in Strpce are divided into three separate groups, depending on which period each group belongs to.

Balkan Wars and World War I memorial
World War II memorial
Kosovo War memorial
 
All of these memorials were built in honor of the people who died fighting for their country. Two of the most decorated warriors were Staja Markovic, after whom the primary school in Strpce is named, and Cvetko Grbic, whose name is borne by the cultural association in Strpce.

The monuments of other villages in Štrpce municipality
The list of cultural monuments in Strpce:

Rakanovac monument
The Putnice Monument, or the Monument in Rakanovac, was built in honor of the family members of the Sharr Mountains squad killed by the Bulgarian fascists in 1944 during World War II. The monument is located on the road between Strpce and Brezovica, on a field called Rakanovac. It was built by the union of the national liberation movement of Strpce.  The monument was reconstructed in 2010 by the municipal board SUBNOR in Strpce. The names of the family members killed are written on the monument, with a poem in their honor. Every year, on 28 June a wreath is laid on the monument for the fallen victims.

The story behind the monument
During the Bulgarian occupation of Strpce in World War II, there was a Sharr Mountains squad of Serbian resistance fighters. During a secret meeting of the squad, two members of the squad were intercepted by Bulgarian soldiers. The Bulgarian soldiers found out about the meeting from a boy whose father was a Serbian traitor and worked for the Bulgarian forces. One of the Serbian squad members killed one of the Bulgarian soldiers and ran into the mountains, while the other squad member was killed.  As an act of revenge for their fallen comrade, Bulgarian fascist soldiers captured all family members of the Sharr Mountains squad, including 12 children. They took them to the St. Nicholas churchyard. At the church they met the father of the dead Bulgarian soldier, who asked the Bulgarian officer not to harm the captured families, but the officer replied that he would execute them all. The officer then agreed not to harm the families, but the next morning when the father went home to Bulgaria, soldiers re-captured all the family members and took them to the place where the soldier had been killed. There they executed them all. When the soldiers were ready to go, they heard the cry of a child. One of the captured children had not died because it was saved by its mother’s body. One of the Bulgarian soldiers went back and killed the child with a bayonet sword. This happened on 28 June 1944. 46 people were executed, including 12 children.

See also
Monuments of Kosovo
Berevce
Brezovica
Štrpce

References

External links
 OSCE Profile of Štrpce / Shtërpcë
 About coat of arms and banner of Štrpce

Štrpce
Medieval Serbian sites in Kosovo